Horehound or hoarhound may refer to:

Plants
 Ballota (also horehound), a genus of flowering evergreen perennial plants and subshrubs in the family Lamiaceae
 Ballota acetabulosa (also Greek horehound), a species of flowering plant in the family Lamiaceae
 Ballota nigra (also black horehound), a perennial herb of the family Lamiaceae
 Ballota undulata (also horehound), a species of flowering plant in the family Lamiaceae
 Lycopus (also waterhorehound), a genus in the family Lamiaceae
 Lycopus americanus (also American water horehound), a member of the genus Lycopus
 Lycopus amplectens (also water-horehound and sessile-leaved water-horehound), a species of Lycopus native to North America
 Lycopus virginicus (also Virginia water horehound and American water hoarhound), a species of flowering plant in the mint family
 Marrubium (also horehound or hoarhound), a genus of flowering plants in the family Lamiaceae
 Marrubium vulgare (also white horehound or common horehound), a flowering plant in the mint family

Other
 Horehound (album), the debut studio album by American rock band the Dead Weather
 Horehound beer, a soft drink carbonated beverage
 Horehound bug, a stink bug which sucks the sap of the horehound plant
 Horehound candy drops, bittersweet hard candies like cough drops that are made with sugar and an extract of M. vulgare
 Wheeleria spilodactylus (also the horehound plume moth), a moth of the family Pterophoridae